Rubin Stadium is a football stadium in Kazan, Russia. It is located in the training ground of FC Rubin Kazan, and served as their home stadium until 1960. It has a capacity of 7,847. It was used as a venue for the 2013 Summer Universiade.

References

FC Rubin Kazan
Football venues in Russia

Sport in Kazan
Buildings and structures in Kazan